Katai is a census town in Thane district in the Indian state of Maharashtra.

Demographics
 India census, Katai had a population of 11,250. Males constitute 74% of the population and females 26%. Katai has an average literacy rate of 67%, higher than the national average of 59.5%: male literacy is 74%, and female literacy is 45%. In Katai, 11% of the population is under 6 years of age.

References

Cities and towns in Thane district